Z-Rock Hawaii is the name of the debut (and only) self-titled album by Z-Rock Hawaii, released in 1996. The supergroup features Gene Ween, Dean Ween and Claude Coleman Jr. of Ween collaborating with Yamantaka Eye, Seiichi Yamamoto, Yoshimi P-We, and Yoshikawa Toyohito of Boredoms.

History
In 1994, during the recording of Chocolate & Cheese, Gene Ween, Dean Ween and Claude Coleman Jr. of Ween collaborated with Japanese noise rock band Boredoms on a project released two years later as Z-Rock Hawaii. Melchiondo had become a big fan of Boredoms upon seeing them live in Philadelphia in 1993, calling them "the heaviest band [he] had ever seen since the Butthole Surfers". Boredoms frontman Yamantaka Eye had previously released an album that heavily sampled Ween's The Pod.

Track listing 
"Chuggin'"
"Bad to the Bone" (George Thorogood and the Destroyers cover)
"In the Garden"
"Love like Cement"
"Tuchus"
"Piledriver"
"I Get a Little Taste of You"
"God in My Bed"
"The Meadow"
"Sunset over Osaka"
"Hexagon" (bonus track)

See also
 Boredoms
 Ween

References

1996 albums